Stickets is an iOS game developed by Australian indie studio Wanderlands and released on May 30, 2013.

Gameplay
Players place the same L-shaped triominos (in one of 4 orientations) into a 5×5 board. Each piece has one yellow, one blue, and one red block. Placing three or more of any colour allows those blocks to disappear. freeing up space. Players keep collecting points until they run out of space.

Reception
The game has a rating of 87% based on 9 critic reviews.

148Apps said "Stickets looks incredibly simple at first, but be prepared to sink hours into the three difficulty modes." Gamezebo wrote "Stickets offers endless chances for improvement and entertainment; I made the right choice sticking with door number one." TouchArcade said "Stickets is the first commercial iOS release from Wanderlands, and it's by far their best, although I highly recommend checking out their free browser games, Midas and Impasse. There's Game Center support, no IAP, and the developers have promised updates with new puzzles and themes." Modojo said "As a collection of surprisingly strategic challenges though, this is one game that deserves a place on every mobile puzzle gamer's phone." Maclife said "Stickets looks deceptively simple, but, well, there's the rub. Brilliant." Edge Magazine wrote "Like all great puzzle games, you're beholden to the whims of fortune, forcing you into leaps of faith that often prove frustratingly fatal. But like all great puzzle games, Stickets' surface simplicity is merely a cover for mechanics of astonishing depth and longevity." Eurogamer said "It almost feels like an entirely new game—as a puzzler's secondary mode always should. Really, though, the small team at Wanderlands is offering more than enough to keep you busy with just one way to play, let alone three." PocketGamerUK said "Stickets is a quietly accomplished and fresh puzzler, though its somewhat narrow focus limits its long-term appeal."

References

2013 video games
IOS games
IOS-only games
GameClub games
Tile-matching video games
Video games developed in Australia